Amadou Dangadji Rabihou (born 2 December 1984) is a Cameroonian former professional footballer who played as a forward.

Career 
Rabihou was born in Douala, Cameroon. He began his career in the youth set up at AC Milan.  In 2002 he moved to Austrian side SK Sturm Graz, playing 65 times and scoring 12 goals. After five years he left the Puntigamer Sturm and moved to French second league team Amiens SC. Unable to force his way into the first team he left, he joined the Slovakian team FK DAC 1904 Dunajská Streda. Once more disgruntled at a lack of game time, Rabihou left the club in January 2009, returning to Austria by signing for Austria Lustenau. In August 2010 he signed a short-term deal with English side Hereford United making his debut on 4 September in a 3–0 away defeat to Burton Albion.

References

External links
 
 
 
 Amadou Rabihou at ÖFB

1984 births
Living people
Association football forwards
Cameroonian footballers
Cameroonian expatriate footballers
Austrian Football Bundesliga players
2. Liga (Austria) players
Ligue 2 players
Slovak Super Liga players
English Football League players
UAE First Division League players
Regionalliga players
Hereford United F.C. players
Amiens SC players
SK Sturm Graz players
SC Austria Lustenau players
FC DAC 1904 Dunajská Streda players
SV Waldhof Mannheim players
Al Urooba Club players
Al Rams Club players
Cameroonian expatriate sportspeople in Italy
Cameroonian expatriate sportspeople in France
Cameroonian expatriate sportspeople in Austria
Cameroonian expatriate sportspeople in Slovakia
Cameroonian expatriate sportspeople in England
Cameroonian expatriate sportspeople in Germany
Cameroonian expatriate sportspeople in the United Arab Emirates
Expatriate footballers in Italy
Expatriate footballers in France
Expatriate footballers in Austria
Expatriate footballers in Slovakia
Expatriate footballers in England
Expatriate footballers in Germany
Expatriate footballers in the United Arab Emirates